Shankar Ramchandra Bhise (born into the Marathi CKP family; 1894–1971), popularly known as "Acharya Bhise" or "Bhise Guruji", was a social worker, educationalist, and novelist devoted to the education and development of the Adivasi community.

Bhise wrote novels, including Janglantil Chhaya, which discusses the exploitation and conditions of Adivasi forest tribes.

References

Marathi people
Indian Hindus
Indian novelists
Hindu reformers
Indian social reformers
1894 births
1971 deaths